Anna Meeker Wheaton (November 26, 1894 – December 25, 1961) was an American musical theatre actress and singer of the early 20th century.

Biography
Wheaton was born on November 26, 1894 (some sources indicate 1893 or 1896), in Savannah, Georgia. As a young child, the family moved to Washington, D.C. While still a youngster, she made her Broadway debut in the American premiere of Peter Pan starring Maude Adams in 1905.

She is perhaps best known for her role as Jackie Simpson in the original production of Oh, Boy! in 1917. The hit musical featured the music of Jerome Kern with lyrics by Guy Bolton and P.G. Wodehouse. In the show, she performed "Till the Clouds Roll By" with Tom Powers. She subsequently recorded the song on Columbia Records with James Harrod, where it climbed to the top of the American music charts for six weeks.

Earlier that year, she had a solo hit with "M-I-S-S-I-S-S-I-P-P-I" from the revue, Hitchy-Koo. The song reached number two on the popular music charts.

Personal
Wheaton married Walter Thomas Collins in New York City on June 18, 1919. The couple had one child, Walter Kendall Collins (1921–1996).

Death
She died from a cerebral hemorrhage on December 25, 1961, in a Pasadena, California hospital.

Theatre credits

Selected discography

References

External links
Anna Wheaton at Discogs
Anna Wheaton at the Internet Broadway Database

1894 births
1961 deaths
American stage actresses
People from Savannah, Georgia
20th-century American actresses